Filingue  is a department of the Tillabéri Region in Niger. Its capital lies at the city of Filingue, and includes the towns of Kourfey, Bonkoukou, Tabala, and Tondikandia. As of 2011, the department had a total population of 553,127 people.

References

Portions of this article were translated from the French language Wikipedia article :fr:Tillabéri (région), 2008-06-19.

Departments of Niger
Tillabéri Region